Francis is a 1950 American black-and-white comedy film from Universal-International that launched the Francis the Talking Mule film series. Francis is produced by Robert Arthur, directed by Arthur Lubin, and stars Donald O'Connor and Patricia Medina. The distinctive voice of Francis is a voice-over by actor Chill Wills.

Six Francis sequels from Universal-International followed this first effort.

During World War II, a junior American Army officer gets sent to the psychiatric ward whenever he insists that an Army mule named Francis speaks to him.

Plot
When a bank manager discovers Peter Stirling, one of his tellers, is attracting public attention he calls the young man in who relates his story in flashback.

Then Second Lieutenant Peter Stirling (Donald O'Connor) is caught behind Japanese lines in Burma during World War II. Francis, a talking Army mule (voiced by Chill Wills), carries him to safety. When Stirling insists that the animal rescued him, he is placed in a psychiatric ward. Each time Stirling is released, he accomplishes something noteworthy (at the instigation of Francis), and each time he is sent back to the psych ward when he insists on crediting the talking mule. Finally, Stirling is able to convince three-star General Stevens (John McIntire) that he is not crazy, and he and the general become the only ones aware of Francis' secret. In an effort to get himself released from the psych ward, Stirling asks Stevens to order Francis to speak, but the mule will not obey until it becomes clear that Stirling will be arrested for treason if he remains silent.

During one of his enforced hospital stays, he is befriended by Maureen Gelder (Patricia Medina), a beautiful French refugee. He grows to trust her and tells her about Francis. Later, a propaganda radio broadcast from Tokyo Rose mocks the Allies for being advised by a mule. This leads to the suspicion of Stirling or Maureen being a Japanese agent. The press is later informed that the absurd mule story was concocted in order to flush out the spy, and with Francis' help, the real culprit is identified.

Francis is shipped back to the U. S. for further study, but his military transport crashes in the wilds of Kentucky. After the war, convinced that Francis survived the crash, Peter searches for and finally finds the mule still alive and well and talking!

Cast

Donald O'Connor as Peter Stirling
Patricia Medina as Maureen Gelder
Chill Wills as Francis the talking mule
ZaSu Pitts as Nurse Valerie Humpert
Ray Collins as Colonel Hooker
John McIntire as General Stevens (as John McIntyre)
Eduard Franz as Colonel Plepper
Howland Chamberlain as Major Nadel
James Todd as Colonel Saunders
Robert Warwick as Colonel Carmichael
Frank Faylen as Sergeant Chillingbacker
Tony Curtis as Captain Jones (as Anthony Curtis)
Mikel Conrad as Major Garber
Loren Tindell as Major Richards
Charles Meredith as Munroe, the banker

Production

Development
Lubin became attached to the film in March 1948. He was attracted to the light material because "as a movie fan myself, I am tired of watching neurotic material on the screen. I can easily skip the latest psychiatric spell binders, but I've seen Miracle on 34th Street a half dozen times."

In September 1948 it was announced Robert Stillman, Joseph H. Nadel, and Arthur Lubin had purchased the film rights from David Stern; Sillman would produce and Lubin would direct. (Lubin said he a friend who worked at a literary agency recommended the book to him.)

Lubin took the film to Universal who were originally not interested. However their story editor, who later became an assistant to Harold Robbins was interested, especially as Universal had a commitment to Donald O'Connor for $30,000 and were looking to make something cheap. The studio advanced Lubin $10,000 as a test to see if he could make the mule talk. The test proved to be successful and Universal agreed to make the film.

They set up the production at Universal where it was turned into a starring vehicle for Donald O'Connor. Lubin worked on the script with Stern. Dorothy Davenport Reid (widow of silent film star Wallace Reid) worked on the script.

Lubin said it was the first time that he had a financial interest in any film he had made:
Directing Francis gave me a new slant on picture making after some years of acting and producing in both New York and Hollywood. I love Francis, first because it's good entertainment, and secondly because I own a bit of that ornery mule.
Apparently Universal records say Lubin was paid a flat fee of $25,000.

Shooting
Filming started 7 May 1949 and continued through to June. Parts of the film were shot at the now defunct Conejo Valley Airport in Thousand Oaks, CA.

Before its release in the U. S., Francis was first shown in January 1950 to Army troops stationed in West Germany.

Francis the mule was signed to a seven-year contract with Universal-International, according to an article in Newsweek magazine. Newsweek also reported that Francis' entourage included "a make-up man, trainer, hairdresser, and sanitary engineer, complete with broom and Airwick."

Robert Arthur the producer later said the film was budgeted at $580,000 but went $42,000 over budget. Lubin later said the film cost $150,000. "Donald got $30,000 at the time, the mule cost nothing. We had three mules then. And we made that picture in fifteen days."

Reception
The film was the eleventh biggest hit of the year in the U.S.

In May 1950 it was announced Universal-International had purchased all rights to the character Francis from author David Stern, including the right to make an unlimited number of sequels.

Diabolique said "Lubin’s handling is always sure and confident, and they contain some genuinely hilarious moments and sensational performances from O’Connor and Chill Wills (who voiced Francis). Admittedly the structure gets repetitive – generally in first half hour everyone thinks Donald O’Connor is mad, then Francis talks to someone, there’s another half hour of people thinking they’re mad, then Francis talks to a few more people, then another half hour and more allegations of madness, then Francis talks to everyone."

Home media
The original film, Francis (1950), was released in 1978 as one of the first-ever titles in the new LaserDisc format, Discovision Catalog #22-003. It was then re-issued on LaserDisc in May 1994 by MCA/Universal Home Video (Catalog #: 42024) as part of an Encore Edition Double Feature with Francis Goes to the Races (1951).

The first two Francis films were released again in 2004 by Universal Pictures on Region 1 and Region 4 DVD, along with the next two in the series, as The Adventures of Francis the Talking Mule Vol. 1. Several years later, Universal released all 7 Francis films as a set on three Region 1 and Region 4 DVDs, Francis The Talking Mule: The Complete Collection.

References

External links

1950 films
1950s fantasy comedy films
American black-and-white films
1950s English-language films
American fantasy comedy films
Films directed by Arthur Lubin
Military humor in film
Films about donkeys
Films set in Myanmar
Burma Campaign films
Universal Pictures films
Films based on American novels
Films scored by Frank Skinner
Films scored by Walter Scharf
1950 comedy films
1950s American films
Film